Harmeet Singh Mamik popularly known as Mamik (born 3 May 1963) is an Indian actor, who works on television and has also worked in a few Bollywood movies. He is best known for his roles in films like Jo Jeeta Wohi Sikandar (1992), Kya Kehna (2000), and television shows like Woh (1998), Ssshhhh...Koi Hai (2002), Vikraal Aur Gabraal (2003), Black (2009), Horror Nights (2010), Who's Your Daddy (Season 2) (2020).

Early life
Harmeet Singh Mamik is also known as Mamik Singh is a prominent  Indian actor, who was born on 3 May 1963 in Mumbai, Maharashtra, India. After completing graduation in commerce, he joined an advertising company (an ad agency) and started his modeling career. He had ad shots for Red Bull, Kinetic, Sona Milk, and many more. Later in the '90s, he auditioned for the role of Ratan in Jo Jeeta Wohi Sikandar by Farah Khan, and later Mansoor Khan approved him for the role. Rest became history when the film has its released.

Career
Mamik made his acting debut in the film, Jo Jeeta Wohi Sikandar (1992) as Aamir Khan's elder brother Ratan. He was selected by director Mansoor Khan for his role in Jo Jeeta Wohi Sikandar. Despite the film's popularity, Mamik didn't sign any assignments in films for five years finding the projects insignificant. So, he started working more on TV serials. Meanwhile, In 1997, he appeared in three more films, Aar Ya Paar, Dil Ke Jharokhe Mein, Koi Kisise Kum Nahin, along with the Kya Kehna (2000), directed by Kundan Shah. After that film, Mamik halted work in Bollywood Films for a long time & debut in the Nepali language movie Hamro Sano Ghar hola playing the lead role opposite to Puja Chand & Rajesh hamal. This film which was a huge success & celebrated more than 51 days in many theatres in Nepal and continued to work on many television hit serials, which include Sadma,Saahil, Maal Hai To Taal Hai, Aa Gale Lag Ja, Saturday Suspense, Champion, Chandrakanta and Woh. Mamik shot into limelight when he starred in the fantasy series, Chandrakanta , alongside Shikha Swaroop and Shahbaz Khan in the lead roles. In 1998, he played as Rahul on Zee TV's horror-thriller series, Woh. After the success of  Woh, he was well appreciated as he did justice in the lead role of a brother. And as Arjun Singh on Doordarshan's fictional series, Yug. In the year 2000, he acted in Kundan Shah's Bollywood hit film, Kya Kehna. This film marks his last performance on the big screen. He then returned to television with a starring role in the horror anthology series,Ssshhhh...Koi Hai

In (2002), Mamik starred as Vikraal, a ghostbuster in Ssshhhh...Koi Hai which earned him accolades and made him a superstar overnight. He has also been awarded as a Favourite Action Star in the Star Parivaar Awards for his role of Vikraal. Same Year he was seen in the biggest Daily Soap Kkusum as ACP Saket Sahani produced by Ekta Kapoor aired on Sony, which was also appreciated. So again he was brought for a few episodes then his role came to an end. He was featured in the movie Mallika, a horror film, in a negative role which was again appreciated. The movie had a moderate response at the box office. He then starred in Chandramukhi on DD1 and Black (Kaala Saaya), which aired on 9X/Sahara One. He also appeared in Kahani Chandrakanta Ki on Sahara One again directed and produced By Sunil Agnihotri.
In 2014, he entered as a party guest in the eighth season of Bigg Boss and a guest performance on Life OK's Savdhaan India.
In 2015, Mamik signed Pen Movies' Do Lafzon Ki Kahani, directed by Deepak Tijori that was released in 2016. Mamik's role got accolades. Do Lafzon Ki Kahani, a remake of the South Korean 2011 film, Always, and was adapted into the 2015 Kannada action film, Boxer. In an interview in the year 2007, he admitted that he got hooked on drugs. Because of this, his family, career, and life were ruined. Mamik is very thankful to his friends and family for being the reason why he totally ended that certain phase in his life. Television sought him out with Agent Raghav - Crime Branch and after that he played Arsalaan in Jaanbaaz Sindbad. Mamik acted in Mayavi Maling in 2016–17. He made his web series debut in "Rangmanch" and Scam 1992 – The Harshad Mehta Story released in SonyLiv App. He did ALTBalaji ' s Who's Your Daddy (Season 2) as Mohak.

ALTBalaji App. He was recently seen in Bell Bottom(2021 film) playing Akshay Kumar's brother Anuj. Also, he will be featuring on the upcoming web-film Despatch starring Manoj Bajpayee

Filmography

Films

Television

References

External links

1963 births
Living people
Indian male film actors
Indian male television actors
Male actors in Hindi cinema
Male actors from Mumbai